The National Tiger Conservation Authority (NTCA) was established in December 2005,  following a recommendation of the Tiger Task Force, constituted by the Prime Minister of India for reorganised management of Project Tiger and the many Tiger Reserves in India.

Background

A programme for protection called, 'Tiger Protection Program' (popularly known as Project Tiger) was started in 1973, by the Government of India in co-operation with WWF.

In June 2010, a detailed survey by the Wildlife Institute of India (WII), which used accurate camera traps for counting tigers rather than the more traditional method of counting footprints (pugmarks), reported that previous estimates of tiger numbers in India may be hugely optimistic. The landmark report, Status of the Tigers, Co-predators, and  Prey in India,  published  by the National Tiger Conservation Authority, estimates only 1411 adult tigers in existence in India (plus uncensused tigers in the Sundarbans).

For example, in the 16 reserves of Madhya Pradesh, Rajasthan, Maharashtra and Chhattisgarh there may be only 490 tigers – a 60% reduction from the 1,233 tigers previously estimated for these areas in 2002. Indeed, the same 2002 survey had claimed that in total, India had 3,500 tigers, whilst the new survey claims that just 1,400 remain.

Translocating villagers out of tiger reserves can be effective too, if sensitively done. The villagers get access to schools and health care and can farm without risk of attack, the tigers’ prey flourishes in the absence of disturbance, and poachers’ activities are harder to disguise. In China, the domestic trade in tiger body parts was banned 14 years ago. However, there are at least 5,000 tigers in tiny cages in China, reportedly just for display. A path breaking new investigation by EIA with assistance from WPSI, has found out that the trade in Tiger skins and bones are still flourishing across the border in Tibet and China. It seems that with so many inbred Tigers in captivity, their owners are hoping to take a monopoly on this clandestine business as soon as the Tigers are declared extinct in the wild. These captive Tigers are unfit to fend for themselves in the wilderness and would effectively mean the end of the species in their natural habitat.

Nevertheless, farmers seem quite open about the fact that tigers are killed so their body parts can be used for Traditional Medicine. At the CITES¹ conference in June, there was a proposal from China to amend the Convention text governing the trade in tiger parts. This would have effectively given China the go-ahead to trade in ‘parts and derivatives’ from captive bred tigers. This proposal was rejected by the CITES Parties, and instead a landmark decision taken, which states that ‘tigers should not be bred for trade in their parts and derivatives’.

The most recent audit of wild tigers by the Authority (in 2018) has estimated the number at 2967 –  an increase of 33% since 2014.

Organisation
The Wildlife Protection Act of 1972 was amended in 2006 to provide for constituting the National Tiger Conservation Authority responsible for implementation of the Project Tiger plan to protect endangered tigers. The National Tiger Conservation Authority is set up under the Chairmanship of the Minister for Environment and Forests. The Authority will have eight experts or professionals having qualifications and experience in wildlife conservation and welfare of people including tribals, apart from three Members of Parliament of whom two will be elected by the House of the People and one by the Council of States. The Inspector General of Forests, in charge of project Tiger, will be ex-officio Member Secretary.

The Authority, interalia, would lay down normative standards, guidelines for tiger conservation in the Tiger Reserves, apart from National Parks and Sanctuaries. It would provide information on protection measures including future conservation plan, tiger estimation, disease surveillance, mortality survey, patrolling, report on untoward happenings and such other management aspects as it may deem fit, including future plan for conservation.

The Authority would also facilitate and support tiger reserve management in the States through eco-development and people's participation as per approved management plans, and support similar initiatives in adjoining areas consistent with the Central and state laws.

The Tiger Conservation Authority would be required to prepare an Annual Report, which would be laid in the Parliament along with the Audit Report.

State level Steering Committees will be set up in the Tiger States under the Chairmanship of respective Chief Ministers. As recommended by the Tiger Task Force constituted by the Prime Minister, this has been done with a view for ensuring coordination, monitoring and protection of tigers in the States.

A provision has been made for the State Governments to prepare a Tiger Conservation Plan, which would include staff development, their deployment to ensure protection of tiger reserves and its development, while ensuring compatible forestry operations in adjoining areas. Further, safeguards have been provided for ensuring the agricultural, livelihood, developmental and other interests of the people living inside a forest or in and around a tiger reserve. The core as well as buffer areas have been explicitly explained to avoid ambiguity.

Provision will be made for the States to establish a Tiger Conservation Foundation, based on the good practices emanating from some tiger reserves. The proposed Foundation is a Trust, which would be constituted as per the appropriate statutory provisions in vogue in the State. It will have administrative autonomy as delegated by the State Government for fund generation to foster eco-tourism, eco-development and related activities involving the local people.

The Wild Life (Protection) Amendment Act, 2006

The Wild Life (Protection) Amendment Act, 2006 (No. 39 of 2006) has come into force on 4 September 2006. The Act provides for creating the National Tiger Conservation Authority and the Tiger and Other Endangered Species Crime Control Bureau (Wildlife Crime Control Bureau).

The implementation over the years has highlighted the need for a statutory authority with legal backing to ensure tiger conservation. On the basis of the recommendations of the National Board for Wildlife, a Task Force was set up to look into the problems of tiger conservation in the country. The recommendations of the Task Force, inter alia include strengthening of Project Tiger by giving it statutory and administrative powers, apart from creating the Wildlife Crime Control Bureau. It has also recommended that an annual report should be submitted to the Central Government for laying in Parliament, so that commitment to Project Tiger is reviewed from time to time, in addition to addressing the concerns of local people.

The National Tiger Conservation Authority would facilitate MoU with States within our federal set up for tiger conservation. It will provide for an oversight by Parliament as well. Further, it will address livelihood interests of local people in areas surrounding Tiger Reserves, apart from ensuring that the rights of Scheduled Tribes and such other people living nearby are not interfered or adversely affected. The core (critical) and buffer (peripheral) areas have been defined, while safeguarding the interests of Scheduled Tribes and such other forest dwellers.

The functions and powers of the Authority, inter alia include : approval of Tiger Conservation Plan prepared by States, laying down normative standards for tiger conservation, providing information on several aspects which include protection, tiger estimation, patrolling, etc., ensuring measures for addressing man-wild animal conflicts and fostering co-existence with local people, preparing annual report for laying before Parliament, constitution of Steering Committee by States, preparation of tiger protection and conservation plans by States, ensuring agricultural, livelihood interests of people living in and around Tiger Reserves, establishing the tiger conservation foundation by States for supporting their development.

The Notification of the National Tiger Conservation Authority has been issued on 4 September 2006, for a period of three years, with the Minister for Environment and Forests as its chairperson and the Minister of State for Environment and Forests as the vice-chairperson. The official members include secretary, Ministry of Environment and Forests, director general of Forests and special secretary, Ministry of Environment and Forests, secretary, Ministry of Tribal Affairs, secretary, Ministry of Social Justice and Empowerment, chairperson, National Commission for the Scheduled Tribes, chairperson of National Commission for the Scheduled Castes, secretary, Ministry of Panchayati Raj, director, Wildlife Preservation, Ministry of Environment and Forests and six chief wildlife wardens (in rotation from Tiger Reserve States) (Arunachal Pradesh, Madhya Pradesh, Orissa, Rajasthan, Tamil Nadu and Uttaranchal). Three Members of Parliament would be nominated by the Parliament. The Ministry of Law and Justice would also be nominating an officer. The Ministry of Environment and Forests is in the process of selecting the eight non-official experts or professionals having prescribed qualifications and experience, of which at least two shall be from the field of tribal development. The Inspector General of Forests in charge of Project Tiger shall be the Member Secretary of the Authority.

The ministry is in the process of creating the Wildlife Crime Control Bureau, invoking the provisions created after the recent amendment. The Bureau would collate intelligence relating to wildlife crime, ensure coordination with State Governments and other Authorities through its set up, apart from developing infrastructure and capacity building for scientific and professional investigation into wildlife crimes and assist the State Governments in successful prosecution of such crimes.

The penalty for an offence relating to the core area of a tiger reserve or hunting in the reserve has been increased. The first conviction in such offence shall be punishable with imprisonment not less than three years but may extend to seven years, and also with fine not less than fifty thousand rupees but may extend to two lakh rupees. The second or subsequent conviction would lead to imprisonment not less than seven years, and also with fine not less than five lakh rupees, which may extend to fifty lakh rupees.

References

External links
 https://ntca.gov.in
http://www.tigerreservepilibhit.com
 http://www.indiaenvironmentportal.org.in/content/national-tiger-conservation-authority

2005 establishments in Delhi
Tigers in India
Wildlife conservation in India
Government agencies of India
Nature conservation organisations based in India
Organisations based in Delhi